The following page lists power stations in Ghana.

Thermal power stations

Hydroelectric power stations

Solar power stations

See also 

Electricity in Ghana
List of largest power stations in the world
List of power stations in Africa

References 

Ghana
 
Power stations